Ernest Mullineux (1879 – 23 August 1960) was an English footballer who played in the English Football League for Burslem Port Vale, Bury and Stoke. He also helped Stoke to win two minor league titles in 1909–10 and 1910–11. A right-back, he made 333 league and FA Cup appearances in a 14-year career. He also later played for Wellington Town.

Career

Burslem Port Vale
Mullineux started off with Burslem Park, before joining Burslem Port Vale in May 1900. He featured in one Second Division game in the 1900–01 season, and then went on to play all 34 league and five FA Cup matches in the 1901–02 season. He again played all 34 games in the 1902–03 campaign, and claimed a goal in a 5–1 defeat to Preston North End at Deepdale on 28 February. He made 40 appearances in the 1903–04 season, missing just one league game, and scored in a 5–0 win over Blackpool at the Athletic Ground on 12 March. He played 13 league games in the 1904–05 season, before the club's grim financial situation meant that he was sold to Bury for a £600 fee in December 1904.

Bury
The "Shakers" finished 17th in the First Division in the 1904–05 season, with Mullineux making ten appearances. He went on to play eleven games in the 1905–06 season, as Bury finished one point above the relegation zone. He featured just once at Gigg Lane in the first half of the 1906–07 campaign.

Stoke
Mullineux signed for Stoke in January 1907. Mullineux became a regular in the side at a time when Stoke were having a financial meltdown which led to the club entering into liquidation in 1908. As a result, Stoke left the English Football League and thus many of their players left the club. However Mullineux stayed at the Victoria Ground, and played for Stoke in the Birmingham & District League and the Southern League and went on to make 184 appearances for the "Potters" in all competitions. During this time, Stoke won the Southern League Division Two A in 1909–10 and the Birmingham & District League in 1910–11. After leaving Stoke in 1914, he went on to join Wellington Town.

Career statistics
Source:

Honours
Stoke
Southern League Division Two A: 1909–10
Birmingham & District League: 1910–11

References

Sportspeople from Hanley, Staffordshire
English footballers
Association football defenders
Port Vale F.C. players
Bury F.C. players
Stoke City F.C. players
Telford United F.C. players
English Football League players
Southern Football League players
1879 births
1960 deaths